Psalmopoeus irminia, also known as the Venezuelan suntiger, is a species of tarantula endemic to Venezuela, Guyana and Brazil.

Description 
Psalmopoeus irminia are unique in their striking black coloration paired with vibrant orange chevron and leg markings. This species can be very defensive when disturbed, yet also has the ability to accelerate from danger very quickly. Like other Psalmopoeus, this species can often be found in tree cavities at a medium height. Females reach six inches in diagonal leg span on average. Males are sexually dimorphic, appearing to have much thinner legs as well losing most of their coloration, it can be hard to distinguish them from Psalmopoeus cambridgei mature males. Like all members of Psalmopoeus , Ps. irminia lack urticating hairs. Eggsacs of this species typically carry 50-200 spiderlings, however, they have the ability to lay two eggsacs from a single mating.

References 

Theraphosidae
Invertebrates of Venezuela
Spiders of South America
Spiders described in 1994